The Diocese of Alajuela is a Latin Church ecclesiastical territory or diocese of the Catholic Church in Costa Rica. It is a suffragan diocese in the ecclesiastical province of the metropolitan Archdiocese of San José de Costa Rica. The Diocese of Alajuela was erected on 16 February 1921.

Bishops

Ordinaries
Antonio del Carmen Monestel Zamora (1921–1937)
Víctor Manuel Sanabria Martínez (1938–1940), appointed Archbishop of San José de Costa Rica
Juan Vicente Solís Fernández (1940–1967)
Enrique Bolaños Quesada (1970–1980)
José Rafael Barquero Arce (1980–2007)
Angel San Casimiro Fernandez, O.A.R. (2007–2018)
Bartolomé Buigues Oller, T.C. (2018- )

Auxiliary bishops
Enrique Bolaños Quesada (1962–1970), appointed Bishop here
José Rafael Barquero Arce (1979-1980), appointed Bishop here

Territorial losses

See also
Catholic Church in Costa Rica
List of Roman Catholic dioceses in Costa Rica

References

External links
 
Official website

Alajuela
Alajuela
Alajuela
1921 establishments in Costa Rica